Senegal elects on the national level a head of state – the president – and a legislature. The president is elected for a seven-year term by the people (between 2001 and 2008, it was a five-year term; this was changed back to the pre-2001 seven-year term in 2008, though incumbent president Macky Sall has stated he wants to have it reverted to five-year terms). 

The National Assembly (Assemblée Nationale) has 150 members, elected for a five-year term, in multi-seat constituencies. Senegal has a multi-party system.

Latest elections

Presidential elections

Parliamentary elections

See also
List of political parties in Senegal

References

External links
Adam Carr's Election Archive
African Elections Database